In coding theory, especially in telecommunications, a self-synchronizing code is a uniquely decodable code in which the symbol stream formed by a portion of one code word, or by the overlapped portion of any two adjacent code words, is not a valid code word. Put another way, a set of strings (called "code words") over an alphabet is called a self-synchronizing code if for each string obtained by concatenating two code words, the substring starting at the second symbol and ending at the second-last symbol does not contain any code word as substring. Every self-synchronizing code is a prefix code, but not all prefix codes are self-synchronizing.

Other terms for self-synchronizing code are synchronized code or, ambiguously, comma-free code. A self-synchronizing code permits the proper framing of transmitted code words provided that no uncorrected errors occur in the symbol stream; external synchronization is not required. Self-synchronizing codes also allow recovery from uncorrected errors in the stream; with most prefix codes, an uncorrected error in a single bit may propagate errors further in the stream and make the subsequent data corrupted.

Importance of self-synchronizing codes is not limited to data transmission. Self-synchronization also facilitates some cases of data recovery, for example of a digitally encoded text.

Examples
 The prefix code {00, 11} is self-synchronizing because 0, 1, 01 and 10 are not codes.
 UTF-8 is self-synchronizing because its leading (11xxxxxx) and trailing (10xxxxxx) bytes have different bit patterns.
 High-Level Data Link Control (HDLC)
 Advanced Data Communication Control Procedures (ADCCP)
 Fibonacci coding

Counterexamples:
 The prefix code {ab,ba} is not self-synchronizing because abab contains ba.
 The prefix code b∗a (using the Kleene star) is not self-synchronizing (even though any new code word simply starts after a) because code word ba contains code word a.

See also
 Bit slip
 Comma code
 Self-clocking signal
 Consistent Overhead Byte Stuffing

References

 
 
 

Line codes
Synchronization